Would You Rather is a 2012 American psychological horror thriller film directed by David Guy Levy and starring Brittany Snow and Jeffrey Combs. It is based on the party game "would you rather", and centers on a woman named Iris as she attends a dinner party, where she must partake in life-threatening games to help her sick younger brother secure a donor after he contracts leukaemia. The film premiered at Screamfest on October 14, 2012. It was released in the United States in select theaters and through video on demand on February 8, 2013, by IFC Midnight.

Plot
Iris, a young woman caring for her sick brother Raleigh, is unable to afford the costs of his treatment for leukaemia. Raleigh's oncologist Dr. Barden introduces Iris to Shepard Lambrick, a philanthropist who heads the Lambrick Foundation, which manages schools and hospitals in third world countries. He offers her a deal: if she wins a parlour game at a dinner party he is hosting, he will pay for Raleigh's treatment and use his foundation's influence to shortlist a bone marrow donor for him.

The following day at Shepard's manor, Iris is introduced to his son Julian and the other contestants: Lucas; Travis, a war veteran; Linda, a paralyzed elderly woman; Peter, a gambling addict; Amy; Conway, an alcoholic debtor; and Cal. A steak and foie gras dinner is served but Iris, a vegetarian, initially declines to eat it. Shepard then offers her $10,000 to compromise her principles; she reluctantly accepts his offer and eats the steak. When Shepard realizes Conway is a recovering alcoholic, he offers him $10,000 to drink a glass of wine. When Conway declines, Shepard offers him $50,000 to drink an entire decanter of Scotch, which Conway accepts.

After dinner ends, Shepard gives the guests an opportunity to leave if they wish. When none do so, the game begins. Shepard reveals it to be a version of the party game "would you rather" in which players must choose between two options. After Shepard's butler, a former MI5 agent named Bevans, wheels in an electric shock machine, Conway attempts to leave but is shot dead. The remaining contestants learn how serious and deadly the game is, and realize they can only win the game if they are the last surviving player. The first round is played by having two contestants connected to the shock machine, with one person deciding whether to shock themselves or the other person. The contestants take turns making the difficult decision, and the round ends with no one eliminated.

After a heated argument occurs between Travis and Shepard's unpleasant son Julian, the second round begins. In the second round, each contestant has 30 seconds to choose between stabbing the person next to them in the thigh with an ice pick or whipping Travis three times with a sjambok. Iris and Lucas choose to whip Travis, out of fear of killing someone, and Travis chooses to be whipped by Bevans. Ultimately, Travis is badly injured and Peter, knowing that Travis won't survive another lashing, stabs Linda in the leg, but he hits the femoral artery and she dies shortly after stabbing Amy. Amy is then given the choice to either whip Travis or choose any player to stab. She chooses to stab Iris, but in the side instead. Thanks to Lucas, Iris survives. Cal then whips Travis enough to have him incapacitated and removed from the game.

Lucas causes a distraction and everyone except Amy attempts to escape the room. Cal advances on Shepard with the sjambok as Lucas attacks the guards and Iris escapes. After Shepard shoots and kills Cal, the others surrender. Shepard sends Bevans and Julian after Iris; Julian finds her and attempts to rape her, but she stabs him with the ice pick. Dr. Barden, who has had second thoughts about sending Iris to Shepard, breaks into the manor to save her. Before they can escape, Bevans kills Dr. Barden and escorts Iris back to the game. Shepard sends Julian to his room for the remainder of the game and personally apologizes to Iris for his son's behavior.

The third round begins with each player having 30 seconds to choose between being submerged underwater in a barrel for two minutes, or an unknown task written on a card that is placed in front of them. Peter chooses a card, which requires him to light an M-80 firecracker in his hand; when it explodes, it causes him to have a heart attack and he dies. Lucas's card forces him to slit open his own eyeball; he does so and survives. Iris chooses the barrel and survives (her unpicked card is revealed: it would have required her to have all of her teeth extracted). Amy, who was witness to her husband drowning their daughter, then chooses her card and learns that she must be submerged underwater for four minutes; she drowns after being forced into the barrel without even being given the chance to take a breath.

With only Iris and Lucas in the final round, Iris is given the choice to either shoot and kill Lucas to win the game, or spare him, which would result in both walking away empty-handed. After some hesitation, Iris shoots Lucas in the chest, killing him. Shepard crowns her the champion and gives her a bag full of money that's more than enough to pay for her brother's treatment, pay off all her debt as well as enable her to go back to the university.  He also explains that a donor has already been located for her brother in Romania.

When Iris arrives home, she discovers that Raleigh committed suicide by overdosing on pills while she was out, as he could not stand being a burden any longer, meaning there was no point in her playing the game. Iris cries in despair for not only her brother is dead but the cruel and disturbing acts she committed to win the money was all for nothing.

Cast

Production
Principal photography on Would You Rather began in July 2011. It was filmed on location in Pasadena, Woodland Hills, and Los Angeles, California.

Reception
Review aggregator Rotten Tomatoes reports that 59% of 22 surveyed critics gave the film a positive review; the average rating is  5.17/10. The consensus reads, "Though restrained by most torture porn standards, Would You Rather brilliant premise is ultimately harmed by its tendency towards blood and guts." Metacritic rated it 20 out of 100, based on 11 reviews.

References

External links
 
 

2012 films
2012 horror thriller films
2012 independent films
2012 psychological thriller films
2010s psychological horror films
American horror thriller films
American independent films
American psychological horror films
American psychological thriller films
Films shot in Los Angeles
Torture in films
Films about death games
2010s English-language films
2010s American films